Demak is a town in Central Java, Indonesia. It is the capital of Demak Regency and the location of the former Sultanate of Demak, briefly the strongest power on the island of Java. The town covers an area of 61.13 km2, and had a population of 110,165 at the 2020 Census.

Climate
Demak has a tropical monsoon climate (Am) with moderate to little rainfall from May to October and heavy to very heavy rainfall from November to April.

References

Demak Regency
Districts of Central Java
Populated places in Central Java
Regency seats of Central Java